Jasper City School District is a school district in Walker County, Alabama. It has five schools including Jasper High School, Jasper Junior High, Maddox Intermediate, T.R. Simmons Elementary, and Memorial Park Elementary.

External links
 

School districts in Alabama